Alan Hawkins may refer to:

Alan J. Hawkins (academic) (born 1955), American academic and professor at Brigham Young University 
Alan J. Hawkins (bishop) (born 1970), American Anglican bishop